A prophet is a person who is believed to speak through divine inspiration.

Prophet or The Prophet may also refer to:

People

People referred to as "The Prophet" as a title 

 The Prophet (musician) (born 1968), Dutch gabber and hardstyle DJ and producer
 Black Prophet (born Kenneth Wilberforce Zonto Bossman, 1977), Ghanaian reggae music composer and a member of the Rastafari movement
 Capleton (born 1967), known as "The Prophet", Jamaican reggae and dancehall artist
 Francis the Prophet (c.1770–1818), a leader of the Red Stick faction of Creek Native Americans
 Muhammad (570s–632), also known as Al-Nabi (The Prophet), regarded by Muslims as the last prophet of God
 Tenskwatawa (1775–1836), Shawnee leader called "The Prophet" or "The Shawnee Prophet"
 Wabokieshiek (ca. 1794 – ca. 1841), Ho-Chunk leader called "The Prophet" or "The Winnebago Prophet"
 Zoroaster (or Zarathushtra), founder of Zoroastrianism, sometimes referred to simply as "The Prophet"

Given name
 Prophet Benjamin (born 1978), Trinidadian reggae singer
 Prophet Omega (1927–1992), American radio evangelist broadcasting

Surname
 Chuck Prophet (born 1963), American musician
 David Prophet (1937–1981), English Formula One driver of the mid-1960s
 Elizabeth Clare Prophet (1939–2009), former leader of the New Age new religious movement The Summit Lighthouse
 John Prophet (1356–1416), English Secretary to King Henry IV, Keeper of the Privy Seal, and Dean of Hereford and York
 Mark L. Prophet (1918–1973), American New Age religious figure
  (born 1962), American actor
 Michael Prophet (1957–2017), English reggae singer
 Nancy Elizabeth Prophet (1890–1960), American sculptor
 Orval Prophet (1922–1984), Canadian country music performer

Arts, entertainment, and media

Fictional characters
 Prophet (comics), an Image Comics character who first appeared in 1992
 Prophet (Star Trek), an alien race in the T.V. show Star Trek: Deep Space Nine
 Laurence "Prophet" Barnes, the leader of Raptor Team in the 2007 video game series Crysis
 Prophets or San'Shyuum, royal rulers of the Covenant in the video games series Halo

Films
 The Prophet, or Il profeta (1968), an Italian comedy directed by Dino Risi
 A Prophet (2009), a French drama directed by Jacques Audiard
 The Prophet (2014 film), an animated film adapted from Kahlil Gibran's book The Prophet

Literature
 Prophet (novel), 1992 Christian novel by Frank E. Peretti
 Al-Anbiya, “The Prophets”, the 21st chapter of the Qur'an
 Nevi'im, "Prophets", the second main division of the Hebrew Bible
 The Prophet (book), 1923 collection of poetry by Kahlil Gibran
 The Prophet (newspaper), a New York City periodical published 1844–1845
 The Prophetess (play), 1647 Jacobean era tragicomedy by John Fletcher and Philip Massinger
 The Prophets (1962), a book by Abraham Joshua Heschel

Music

Albums

 The Prophet (album), 1972 album by American jazz organist Johnny Hammond
 Prophet (Oliver Lake album), 1980 album by American jazz saxophonist Oliver Lake
 Prophet (Prophet album), 1985 album by Prophet
 Prophet (Jerusalem album), 1994 album by Swedish hard rock band Jerusalem
 Prophets (album), 2010 album by Canadian metalcore band Counterparts
 Prophet (Ramona Falls album), 2012 album by Ramona Falls

Other uses in music
 Prophet (band), an American Melodic Rock band
 "Prophet (Better Watch It)", 2011 song by British hip hop duo Rizzle Kicks from the album, Stereo Typical
Prophet Entertainment, or Prophet Posse, an American record label
 Dioclesian or The Prophetess, 1690 semi-opera by Henry Purcell
 "The Prophet", 2001 song by Gary Moore from the album Back to the Blues
 "Prophet", a 2019 song by King Princess from her album Cheap Queen
 Le prophète (or The Prophet), 1849 opera by Giacomo Meyerbeer
Prophet, a line of synthesizers manufactured by Sequential

Other uses in arts,  entertainment, and media
 The Prophet (4/7), a 1933 sculpture by Spanish artist Pablo Gargallo
 The Prophet (telenovela), a 2006–2007 Brazilian soap opera

Other uses
 Prophet (company), an American consulting firm and agency

See also
 Profit (disambiguation)
 Prophecy (disambiguation)
 Propheteer (disambiguation)